Lawrence Holland is an American video game designer and founder of the now defunct Totally Games. He is best known for the Star Wars: X-Wing series published by LucasArts.

Early life
His interest in computer programming started when his college roommate attempted to program a game onto his computer. After buying his own computer, Lawrence Holland studied to figure out how the computer worked and began his career in game design. In 1983, Holland was hired by Human Engineered Software (HESware) to program and convert arcade games to home computers. He started his own team, Micro Imagery, while working with HESware in 1984. During this time, he invented his own game and composed/programmed music for numerous video games.

Career
His first game was called Slime for the VIC-20. He went on to do the music for the Commodore 64 and Apple II versions of The Bard's Tale.

Other early games include
Spike's Peak, Super Zaxxon and Project Space Station.

He became an independent game developer, and achieved notability through a series of World War II flight simulators developed for LucasArts (then LucasFilm Games): Battlehawks 1942, Their Finest Hour and Secret Weapons of the Luftwaffe.

The success of his World War II flight simulators lead to him being approached to develop a series of space flight simulators in the Star Wars franchise. The resulting game Star Wars: X-Wing, followed by Star Wars: TIE Fighter, Star Wars: X-Wing vs. TIE Fighter and Star Wars: X-Wing Alliance.

Holland took a break from LucasArts owned licenses in 2002 to work on a Star Trek licensed product Star Trek: Bridge Commander for Activision.  His next release was a return to World War II flight simulators with Secret Weapons Over Normandy in 2003.  The game was well received but sales were disappointing. His most recent release, 2007's Alien Syndrome, for the Sony PSP and the Nintendo Wii, was met with negative reception and sales.

Games

References

External links
Lawrence Holland at MobyGames

American video game designers
American video game directors
American video game programmers
Cornell University alumni
Creative directors
Living people
Lucasfilm people
Year of birth missing (living people)